The Tralee-Fenit Greenway is a greenway and rail trail in Ireland, which is due to form part of EuroVelo EV1 and the Great Southern Trail. The 14km route was planned to be completed by 2021, but delayed due to the COVID pandemic, with a rescheduled opening of summer 2022. The first phase of the greenway, comprising 6.5km of the route, was opened in June 2022, this was extended to 11.2km in October 2022.

History 

In 2017, CIÉ agreed to divest the Tralee - Fenit and North Kerry railways to Kerry County Council, in order to facilitate the completion of the Kerry Greenways. Initially planned to open in 2021, the project completion date was updated to 2022 owing to a "planning matter". The planned route required the development of new underpasses.

Blockades
Soon after the official opening, gates on the greenway were blocked-off by third-parties on multiple occasions.

Great Southern Greenway 
As the Tralee - Fenit and Tralee - Limerick railways shared the same rail-bed out of Tralee, the first 3km of the Tralee Fenit Greenway also forms part of the Great Southern Trail and EuroVelo EV1.

References

External links 

Footage of the progress of construction of the greenway from StickyBottle.com

Irish Greenways
Transport in County Kerry
Rail trails in the Republic of Ireland